Stigmella braunella is a moth of the family Nepticulidae which is endemic to California. The species was first described by W. W. Jones in 1933.

There are two generations per year with late-instar larvae being encountered throughout the year.

The larvae feed on Prunus ilicifolia. They mine the leaves of their host plant. The mine is located on the upper surface and is linear or serpentine and convoluted terminally and in this region frequently crossing itself or forming a blotch. Later it gradually increasing in width throughout its length. The frass is deposited centrally as a continuous line.

References

External links
A taxonomic revision of the North American species of Stigmella (Lepidoptera: Nepticulidae)

Further reading

Nepticulidae
Endemic fauna of California
Moths of North America
Fauna of the California chaparral and woodlands
Moths described in 1933
Fauna without expected TNC conservation status